Comins Coch is a small village in Ceredigion, Wales, in Faenor community, to the northeast of Aberystwyth. There are approximately 300 residents living in the village. There is a primary school, a phone box and a post box. There is a primary school called Ysgol Comins Coch or Comins Coch Primary School. In the school there are approximately 170 pupils. The current headteacher is called Mr. Tom Fanning.

External links
Local home page
 http://www.cominscoch.ceredigion.sch.uk/
			

Villages in Ceredigion